The 2016 African Handball Champions League was the 38th edition, organized by the African Handball Confederation, under the auspices of the International Handball Federation, the handball sport governing body. The tournament was held from October 21–30, 2016 at the Palais de Sports de Ouagadougou in Burkina Faso, contested by 10 teams and won by Al Ahly of Egypt.

Al Ahly qualified to the 2017 IHF Super Globe.

Draw

Preliminary rounds

Times given below are in GMT UTC+0.

Group A

 Note:  Advance to quarter-finals Relegated to 9th place classification

Group B

 Note:  Advance to quarter-finals Relegated to 9th place classification

Knockout stage
Championship bracket

5-8th bracket

9th place

Final standings

Awards

See also 
 2016 African Handball Cup Winners' Cup

External links
 
 Tournament profile at Goalzz.com

References 

African Handball Champions League
2016 in African handball
2016 in Burkinabé sport